Australia II (KA 6) is an Australian 12-metre-class America's Cup challenge racing yacht that was launched in 1982 and won the 1983 America's Cup for the Royal Perth Yacht Club. Skippered by John Bertrand, she was the first successful Cup challenger, ending a 132-year tenure (with 26 successful defences) by the New York Yacht Club.

Design
Australia II was designed by Ben Lexcen, built by Steve Ward, owned by Alan Bond and skippered by John Bertrand. Lexcen's Australia II design featured a reduced waterline length and a short chord winged keel which gave the boat a significant advantage in manoeuvrability and heeling moment (lower ballast center of gravity) but it was a significant disadvantage in choppy seas. The boat was also very quick in stays. The winged keel was a major design advance, and its legality was questioned by the New York Yacht Club. During the summer of 1983, as selection trials took place for the Cup defence that autumn, the New York Yacht Club challenged the legality of the keel design. The controversy was decided in Australia IIs favour.

Australia II sported a number of other innovative features that contributed to her success, including radical vertical sail designs, all-kevlar running rigging and a lightweight carbon fibre boom.

Later claims of Dutch design
In 2009, more than two decades after Ben Lexan's death, Dutch naval architect Peter van Oossanen claimed that the winged keel was actually designed by him and his group of Dutch designers, and not Lexcen. If true, this would have been reason to disqualify Australia II, since the rules then stated that challenging yachts were to be designed only by citizens of the nations they represented.

The controversy arose due to Cup rules allowing designers to use model basins for testing that were not located in the challenging country. Model testing was performed in the Netherlands and Peter van Oossanen and another Dutch engineer, Joop Sloof, performed measurements and analyses related to evaluation of winged keel designs.

The suggestion that the vessel was not designed by Australians has been refuted by both John Bertrand and project manager John Longley. Furthermore, it is well established that Lexcen had been experimenting with wing adaptations to the undersurface appendages of boats before, including his 1958 skiffs Taipan and Venom, although in the latter application they were not determined to be effective and not further adopted.

In 1983 Lexcen commented on the design issue: "I have in mind to admit it all to the New York Yacht Club that I really owe the secret of the design to a Greek guy who helped me out and was invaluable. He's been dead for 2000 years. Bloody Archimedes..."

Competitions

Louis Vuitton Cup

Australia II dominated the 1983 Louis Vuitton Cup before defeating Azzurra in the semi finals and Victory 83 in the final to win the trophy and earn the right to challenge for the America's Cup.

America's Cup

Australia II, bearing sail number KA6, represented the Royal Perth Yacht Club of Australia in its September 1983 challenge for the America's Cup. The defender, the New York Yacht Club, had held the cup since 1851, dominating challengers and sustaining the longest winning streak in sport.

Australia II, skippered by John Bertrand, faced Dennis Conner sailing the 12-metre Liberty in the ocean off Newport, Rhode Island. Australia II came from behind to prevail 4 races to 3. The victory on 26 September 1983 was a landmark event for the nation of Australia, not to mention the Royal Perth Yacht Club. The achievement was underscored when Australia II was awarded the ABC Wide World of Sports Athlete of the Year for 1983.
The crew of Australia II for the America's Cup races was John Bertrand (skipper), Will Baillieu, Colin Beashel, Rob Brown , Peter Costello, Damian Fewster, James Hardy (alternate helm), Ken Judge, Skip Lissiman, John Longley, Scott McAllister, Brian Richardson, Phil Smidmore, Grant Simmer, and Hugh Treharne. Beashel was an Olympic medal winning sailor who competed at six Olympic games. Richardson was a dual-Olympian oarsman who had stroked the Australian men's eight at the Moscow 1980 Olympics and Baillieu had also rowed for Australia, in a coxed four at the 1972 Munich Olympics.

Popular culture
The Boxing Kangaroo was the official mascot of the Australia II effort.

The win was received with much enthusiasm in Australia, with the Men at Work song "Down Under" becoming the official anthem for the crew.

Retirement
In the mid-1980s, Australia II was sold by Alan Bond to the Australian government. She was lent to the Australian National Maritime Museum in Sydney for display in 1991. In 2000, Australia II was removed from the National Maritime Museum and transferred to the Western Australian Maritime Museum in Fremantle. For the 150th anniversary celebrations of the America's Cup in 2001, she was removed from the museum and shipped to the Isle of Wight, sailing with the original crew for several days of commemorative regattas. Australia II was returned to the Western Australian Maritime Museum, where she is on permanent display.

In 2017, the Team of Australia II were among the inaugural inductees to the Australian Sailing Hall of Fame.

References

Further reading
Schmitt, Hugh. (1987) Australia II – details on the housing of the yacht The West Australian 28 May 1987, p. 16a-c b

External links

 33rd America's Cup: Where are they now: Australia II  KA 6

America's Cup challengers
Individual sailing vessels
12-metre class yachts
Sailing in Western Australia
Ships of Australia
Museum ships in Australia
Ships preserved in museums
Tourist attractions in Western Australia
Sailing yachts designed by Ben Lexcen
1980s sailing yachts
Sailing yachts built in Australia
Louis Vuitton Cup yachts
1983 America's Cup
1982 ships